Ian Barry may refer to:

 Ian Barry (motorcycle builder), founder of Falcon Motorcycles
 Ian Barry (director), Australian director of film and TV